Milan is a 2004 Philippine romantic drama film directed by Olivia Lamasan, released under Star Cinema (ABS-CBN Film Productions, Inc.) in the Philippines. It stars Claudine Barretto and Piolo Pascual.

Synopsis
This story follows the journey of naive Lino (Piolo Pascual) as he searches for his missing wife Mary Grace in Italy. He comes across Jenny (Claudine Barretto), an imposing figure in the Filipino community of migrant workers, whose dreams of grandeur have clouded her need for personal relationships. In a desperate quest for game and survival, the two find refuge and affirmation in each other. What started as a mentor – protégé relationship, Lino and Jenny’s partnership evolves beautifully into a self-consuming love affair. Until these are put to a test. Reality bites as the land changes everything.

In the end, it matters not that Lino finds his wife for he has found himself. And alas, it matters not for Jenny that she sacrifices for love, for she has learned to give, in order to live again.

Cast

Main cast
Claudine Barretto as Jenny
Piolo Pascual as Lino

Supporting cast
Iza Calzado as Mary Grace
Ilonah Jean as Vangie
Ryan Eigenmann as Perry
Lotlot de Leon as Ruth
 Pia Moran as Baby
 Cecil Paz as Attorney
 At Maculangan as Jomar
 Ward Luarca as Kuya Ward
 Lollie Mara as Ate Connie
 Irma Adlawan as Mary Grace's aunt
 Maritess Joaquin as Mary Grace's mother
 Cathy Garcia Molina as Pinoy OFW worker (cameo)

Production
Shootings for the film were primarily done in Milan and other Italian cities such as Venice where there are a sizable Filipino communities. Malou Santos of Star Cinema was behind the idea of making Milan the primary setting of the film because the base of ABS-CBN's The Filipino Channel in Europe is in the city. Director Olivia Lamasan requested Star Cinema that the budget for the film not to be lower than ₱30 million so that her film's quality would not be compromised, if not Lamasan expressed that she can't do the film. Star Cinema headed to the request. Lamasan described her film as a "labor of love" and said that in her stay in Italy for a month, the whole production team including the actors and actresses had to do other tasks such as in preparing the props when not in scene.

Release
The film premiered on February 11, 2004. In April 2004, the film was released in VHS, VCD, and DVD. The VCD and DVD versions includes bonus features and scenes from the film.

In 2015, ABS-CBN Film Restoration Project restored the film and released a digitally remastered version of the film in iTunes.

Reception 
Box office

The film grossed a total of P135.88 million against its estimated P30 million budget.

Critical reception

The film received widespread critical acclaim from critics upon its release. Nestor Torre from Philippine Daily Inquirer stated "Olivia Lamasan's Milan is a unique viewing experience because it combined drama, romance, and social commentary. This ambitious combination makes the film a should-see in our book." Mario Bautista from people's Journal said in his review "The two lead characters are truly well-defined, so we get to really care for them" Rina Jimenez-David from Philippine Daily Inquirer stated  "Isn't it a good thing that it is our artists, the filmmakers of Milan, who persist in drawing our attention to the hidden costs of labor export, not the lease of which is the heartbreak of exile and alienation?"

Soundtrack
The theme song of the movie The Gift was performed by Piolo Pascual (cover version of Jim Brickman with the same title of the song).

Awards and nominations

See also
Dubai (2005 film)

References

External links
 

2004 films
2004 romantic drama films
Films directed by Olivia Lamasan
Films shot in Milan
Films shot in Rome
Films shot in Venice
Philippine romantic drama films
Star Cinema films